VShojo (officially VShojo, Inc.) is a VTuber company based in the United States. VShojo bills itself as a "talent first" VTuber agency, oriented towards providing resources (such as models, merchandising, and advertisement opportunities) to their talents.

Overview
CEO Justin "TheGunrun" Ignacio, a member of the team that founded Twitch, CTO Phillip "MowtenDoo" Fortunat, a content creator on YouTube, and COO Daniel "Apek" Sanders, a former digital media attorney, co-founded VShojo to promote and empower English-speaking VTubers. It debuted on November 24, 2020, as one of the first VTuber companies based in the United States and the Western world.

In October 2021, Ironmouse and Veibae were listed, for the first time, among the top 10 female streamers on Twitch based on hours watched. On February 15, 2022, Ironmouse passed one million followers and 75,000 subscribers on Twitch, making her Twitch's most-subscribed female streamer. On February 20, 2022, Ironmouse's Twitch subscription count surpassed 93,000 making her, at the time, the streamer with the most active Twitch subscriptions.

In March 2022, VShojo raised $11 million in a funding round led by Anthos Capital, with goals to expand its focus on working with anime and gaming conventions on content and appearances by its talent, Ignacio's "IRL Backpack" project for mobile video streaming, and a collaboration with the mental health group Rise Above the Disorder.

In July 2022 at Anime Expo, the company announced a new Japanese division, with its inaugural members including independent streamer Kson, and Nazuna.

Awards and nominations

See also
Hololive Production
Nijisanji

References

External links

 
American companies established in 2020
Multi-channel networks